The 2003–04 Minnesota Wild season was the team's fourth season in the National Hockey League (NHL). Despite an incredible playoff run the previous year in 2002–03, the Wild failed to qualify for the 2004 Stanley Cup playoffs.

Off-season

Regular season

All-Star Game

The 2004 NHL All-Star Game was held on February 8, 2004, at the Xcel Energy Center in St. Paul, Minnesota, home the Wild. The Eastern Conference defeated the Western Conference 6–4.

Final standings

Schedule and results

|- align="center" bgcolor="#FFBBBB"
|1||L||October 8, 2003||0–1 || align="left"| @ Chicago Blackhawks (2003–04) ||0–1–0–0 || 
|- align="center" bgcolor="#CCFFCC" 
|2||W||October 10, 2003||5–3 || align="left"|  New York Rangers (2003–04) ||1–1–0–0 || 
|- align="center" bgcolor="#FFBBBB"
|3||L||October 12, 2003||2–3 || align="left"|  San Jose Sharks (2003–04) ||1–2–0–0 || 
|- align="center" bgcolor="#FFBBBB"
|4||L||October 16, 2003||2–5 || align="left"|  Colorado Avalanche (2003–04) ||1–3–0–0 || 
|- align="center" 
|5||T||October 18, 2003||2–2 OT|| align="left"|  Vancouver Canucks (2003–04) ||1–3–1–0 || 
|- align="center" bgcolor="#FFBBBB"
|6||L||October 19, 2003||1–3 || align="left"| @ Dallas Stars (2003–04) ||1–4–1–0 || 
|- align="center" bgcolor="#FFBBBB"
|7||L||October 21, 2003||2–3 || align="left"|  Calgary Flames (2003–04) ||1–5–1–0 || 
|- align="center" bgcolor="#CCFFCC" 
|8||W||October 24, 2003||4–3 || align="left"| @ Florida Panthers (2003–04) ||2–5–1–0 || 
|- align="center" bgcolor="#FFBBBB"
|9||L||October 25, 2003||2–3 || align="left"| @ Tampa Bay Lightning (2003–04) ||2–6–1–0 || 
|- align="center" bgcolor="#CCFFCC" 
|10||W||October 28, 2003||3–1 || align="left"| @ Buffalo Sabres (2003–04) ||3–6–1–0 || 
|- align="center" bgcolor="#CCFFCC" 
|11||W||October 30, 2003||3–2 || align="left"|  Atlanta Thrashers (2003–04) ||4–6–1–0 || 
|-

|- align="center" bgcolor="#CCFFCC" 
|12||W||November 1, 2003||2–1 || align="left"|  Washington Capitals (2003–04) ||5–6–1–0 || 
|- align="center" 
|13||T||November 4, 2003||4–4 OT|| align="left"| @ Colorado Avalanche (2003–04) ||5–6–2–0 || 
|- align="center" bgcolor="#CCFFCC" 
|14||W||November 7, 2003||3–0 || align="left"| @ Calgary Flames (2003–04) ||6–6–2–0 || 
|- align="center" bgcolor="#FFBBBB"
|15||L||November 8, 2003||3–4 || align="left"| @ Vancouver Canucks (2003–04) ||6–7–2–0 || 
|- align="center" bgcolor="#CCFFCC" 
|16||W||November 11, 2003||1–0 || align="left"|  Vancouver Canucks (2003–04) ||7–7–2–0 || 
|- align="center" bgcolor="#FFBBBB"
|17||L||November 13, 2003||0–2 || align="left"|  Edmonton Oilers (2003–04) ||7–8–2–0 || 
|- align="center" 
|18||T||November 15, 2003||1–1 OT|| align="left"|  Detroit Red Wings (2003–04) ||7–8–3–0 || 
|- align="center" bgcolor="#CCFFCC" 
|19||W||November 19, 2003||6–2 || align="left"| @ Pittsburgh Penguins (2003–04) ||8–8–3–0 || 
|- align="center" bgcolor="#FFBBBB"
|20||L||November 20, 2003||1–3 || align="left"| @ Philadelphia Flyers (2003–04) ||8–9–3–0 || 
|- align="center" bgcolor="#FFBBBB"
|21||L||November 22, 2003||2–5 || align="left"|  Detroit Red Wings (2003–04) ||8–10–3–0 || 
|- align="center" bgcolor="#FFBBBB"
|22||L||November 26, 2003||1–3 || align="left"|  Dallas Stars (2003–04) ||8–11–3–0 || 
|- align="center" bgcolor="#FFBBBB"
|23||L||November 28, 2003||1–2 || align="left"|  San Jose Sharks (2003–04) ||8–12–3–0 || 
|- align="center" 
|24||T||November 30, 2003||1–1 OT|| align="left"|  Mighty Ducks of Anaheim (2003–04) ||8–12–4–0 || 
|-

|- align="center" bgcolor="#CCFFCC" 
|25||W||December 3, 2003||1–0 || align="left"| @ Edmonton Oilers (2003–04) ||9–12–4–0 || 
|- align="center" bgcolor="#FFBBBB"
|26||L||December 5, 2003||1–2 || align="left"| @ Calgary Flames (2003–04) ||9–13–4–0 || 
|- align="center" 
|27||T||December 6, 2003||1–1 OT|| align="left"| @ Vancouver Canucks (2003–04) ||9–13–5–0 || 
|- align="center" bgcolor="#CCFFCC" 
|28||W||December 9, 2003||2–1 || align="left"|  Calgary Flames (2003–04) ||10–13–5–0 || 
|- align="center" bgcolor="#FFBBBB"
|29||L||December 11, 2003||0–1 || align="left"|  Toronto Maple Leafs (2003–04) ||10–14–5–0 || 
|- align="center" bgcolor="#CCFFCC" 
|30||W||December 13, 2003||3–2 || align="left"|  Buffalo Sabres (2003–04) ||11–14–5–0 || 
|- align="center" bgcolor="#CCFFCC" 
|31||W||December 15, 2003||5–2 || align="left"| @ Phoenix Coyotes (2003–04) ||12–14–5–0 || 
|- align="center" bgcolor="#CCFFCC" 
|32||W||December 17, 2003||3–2 || align="left"| @ Colorado Avalanche (2003–04) ||13–14–5–0 || 
|- align="center" 
|33||T||December 18, 2003||1–1 OT|| align="left"| @ Edmonton Oilers (2003–04) ||13–14–6–0 || 
|- align="center" bgcolor="#CCFFCC" 
|34||W||December 20, 2003||5–2 || align="left"|  Columbus Blue Jackets (2003–04) ||14–14–6–0 || 
|- align="center" 
|35||T||December 23, 2003||3–3 OT|| align="left"|  Nashville Predators (2003–04) ||14–14–7–0 || 
|- align="center" 
|36||T||December 26, 2003||2–2 OT|| align="left"| @ Detroit Red Wings (2003–04) ||14–14–8–0 || 
|- align="center" 
|37||T||December 29, 2003||2–2 OT|| align="left"| @ Calgary Flames (2003–04) ||14–14–9–0 || 
|- align="center" 
|38||T||December 30, 2003||2–2 OT|| align="left"| @ Edmonton Oilers (2003–04) ||14–14–10–0 || 
|-

|- align="center" bgcolor="#FFBBBB"
|39||L||January 2, 2004||1–2 || align="left"|  Edmonton Oilers (2003–04) ||14–15–10–0 || 
|- align="center" bgcolor="#FFBBBB"
|40||L||January 4, 2004||1–3 || align="left"| @ Colorado Avalanche (2003–04) ||14–16–10–0 || 
|- align="center" 
|41||T||January 5, 2004||1–1 OT|| align="left"| @ St. Louis Blues (2003–04) ||14–16–11–0 || 
|- align="center" bgcolor="#CCFFCC" 
|42||W||January 7, 2004||7–4 || align="left"|  Chicago Blackhawks (2003–04) ||15–16–11–0 || 
|- align="center" bgcolor="#FFBBBB"
|43||L||January 9, 2004||0–2 || align="left"|  Phoenix Coyotes (2003–04) ||15–17–11–0 || 
|- align="center" 
|44||T||January 12, 2004||3–3 OT|| align="left"|  Nashville Predators (2003–04) ||15–17–12–0 || 
|- align="center" 
|45||T||January 14, 2004||2–2 OT|| align="left"|  Los Angeles Kings (2003–04) ||15–17–13–0 || 
|- align="center" bgcolor="#CCFFCC" 
|46||W||January 16, 2004||4–2 || align="left"|  Pittsburgh Penguins (2003–04) ||16–17–13–0 || 
|- align="center" 
|47||T||January 17, 2004||2–2 OT|| align="left"| @ St. Louis Blues (2003–04) ||16–17–14–0 || 
|- align="center" bgcolor="#FFBBBB"
|48||L||January 19, 2004||0–2 || align="left"| @ Nashville Predators (2003–04) ||16–18–14–0 || 
|- align="center" bgcolor="#CCFFCC" 
|49||W||January 21, 2004||4–2 || align="left"|  Chicago Blackhawks (2003–04) ||17–18–14–0 || 
|- align="center" bgcolor="#FFBBBB"
|50||L||January 23, 2004||2–6 || align="left"| @ Mighty Ducks of Anaheim (2003–04) ||17–19–14–0 || 
|- align="center" bgcolor="#FFBBBB"
|51||L||January 24, 2004||0–4 || align="left"| @ San Jose Sharks (2003–04) ||17–20–14–0 || 
|- align="center" 
|52||T||January 26, 2004||2–2 OT|| align="left"| @ Los Angeles Kings (2003–04) ||17–20–15–0 || 
|- align="center" bgcolor="#FF6F6F"
|53||OTL||January 29, 2004||2–3 OT|| align="left"|  Montreal Canadiens (2003–04) ||17–20–15–1 || 
|- align="center" bgcolor="#FF6F6F"
|54||OTL||January 31, 2004||1–2 OT|| align="left"| @ Columbus Blue Jackets (2003–04) ||17–20–15–2 || 
|-

|- align="center" bgcolor="#CCFFCC" 
|55||W||February 2, 2004||4–0 || align="left"|  St. Louis Blues (2003–04) ||18–20–15–2 || 
|- align="center" bgcolor="#CCFFCC" 
|56||W||February 4, 2004||4–3 || align="left"| @ New York Rangers (2003–04) ||19–20–15–2 || 
|- align="center" bgcolor="#FFBBBB"
|57||L||February 10, 2004||1–3 || align="left"|  Los Angeles Kings (2003–04) ||19–21–15–2 || 
|- align="center" bgcolor="#CCFFCC" 
|58||W||February 13, 2004||3–0 || align="left"|  Edmonton Oilers (2003–04) ||20–21–15–2 || 
|- align="center" bgcolor="#FFBBBB"
|59||L||February 15, 2004||1–2 || align="left"|  Calgary Flames (2003–04) ||20–22–15–2 || 
|- align="center" 
|60||T||February 17, 2004||4–4 OT|| align="left"| @ New Jersey Devils (2003–04) ||20–22–16–2 || 
|- align="center" bgcolor="#CCFFCC" 
|61||W||February 19, 2004||6–2 || align="left"|  Vancouver Canucks (2003–04) ||21–22–16–2 || 
|- align="center" bgcolor="#FFBBBB"
|62||L||February 22, 2004||1–3 || align="left"|  Colorado Avalanche (2003–04) ||21–23–16–2 || 
|- align="center" bgcolor="#FFBBBB"
|63||L||February 26, 2004||0–4 || align="left"| @ Nashville Predators (2003–04) ||21–24–16–2 || 
|- align="center" bgcolor="#FFBBBB"
|64||L||February 27, 2004||1–3 || align="left"| @ Dallas Stars (2003–04) ||21–25–16–2 || 
|- align="center" 
|65||T||February 29, 2004||3–3 OT|| align="left"|  Carolina Hurricanes (2003–04) ||21–25–17–2 || 
|-

|- align="center" bgcolor="#FFBBBB"
|66||L||March 3, 2004||0–2 || align="left"| @ Mighty Ducks of Anaheim (2003–04) ||21–26–17–2 || 
|- align="center" 
|67||T||March 4, 2004||1–1 OT|| align="left"| @ Los Angeles Kings (2003–04) ||21–26–18–2 || 
|- align="center" 
|68||T||March 7, 2004||1–1 OT|| align="left"| @ Phoenix Coyotes (2003–04) ||21–26–19–2 || 
|- align="center" bgcolor="#CCFFCC" 
|69||W||March 9, 2004||4–3 || align="left"| @ San Jose Sharks (2003–04) ||22–26–19–2 || 
|- align="center" 
|70||T||March 10, 2004||1–1 OT|| align="left"| @ Vancouver Canucks (2003–04) ||22–26–20–2 || 
|- align="center" bgcolor="#CCFFCC" 
|71||W||March 14, 2004||3–2 || align="left"|  Columbus Blue Jackets (2003–04) ||23–26–20–2 || 
|- align="center" bgcolor="#CCFFCC" 
|72||W||March 16, 2004||5–2 || align="left"|  Ottawa Senators (2003–04) ||24–26–20–2 || 
|- align="center" bgcolor="#CCFFCC" 
|73||W||March 18, 2004||2–0 || align="left"| @ Boston Bruins (2003–04) ||25–26–20–2 || 
|- align="center" bgcolor="#FFBBBB"
|74||L||March 19, 2004||1–3 || align="left"| @ New York Islanders (2003–04) ||25–27–20–2 || 
|- align="center" bgcolor="#FF6F6F"
|75||OTL||March 22, 2004||2–3 OT|| align="left"|  Phoenix Coyotes (2003–04) ||25–27–20–3 || 
|- align="center" bgcolor="#FFBBBB"
|76||L||March 24, 2004||0–2 || align="left"| @ Columbus Blue Jackets (2003–04) ||25–28–20–3 || 
|- align="center" bgcolor="#CCFFCC" 
|77||W||March 25, 2004||8–2 || align="left"| @ Chicago Blackhawks (2003–04) ||26–28–20–3 || 
|- align="center" bgcolor="#CCFFCC" 
|78||W||March 28, 2004||2–1 || align="left"|  Mighty Ducks of Anaheim (2003–04) ||27–28–20–3 || 
|- align="center" bgcolor="#FFBBBB"
|79||L||March 29, 2004||3–5 || align="left"| @ Detroit Red Wings (2003–04) ||27–29–20–3 || 
|- align="center" bgcolor="#CCFFCC" 
|80||W||March 31, 2004||5–4 OT|| align="left"|  Colorado Avalanche (2003–04) ||28–29–20–3 || 
|-

|- align="center" bgcolor="#CCFFCC" 
|81||W||April 2, 2004||4–2 || align="left"|  Dallas Stars (2003–04) ||29–29–20–3 || 
|- align="center" bgcolor="#CCFFCC" 
|82||W||April 4, 2004||3–0 || align="left"|  St. Louis Blues (2003–04) ||30–29–20–3 || 
|-

|-
| Legend:

Player statistics

Scoring
 Position abbreviations: C = Center; D = Defense; G = Goaltender; LW = Left Wing; RW = Right Wing
  = Joined team via a transaction (e.g., trade, waivers, signing) during the season. Stats reflect time with the Wild only.
  = Left team via a transaction (e.g., trade, waivers, release) during the season. Stats reflect time with the Wild only.

Goaltending

Awards and records

Awards

Milestones

Transactions
The Wild were involved in the following transactions from June 10, 2003, the day after the deciding game of the 2003 Stanley Cup Finals, through June 7, 2004, the day of the deciding game of the 2004 Stanley Cup Finals.

Trades

Players acquired

Players lost

Signings

Draft picks
The 2003 NHL Entry Draft was held at the Gaylord Entertainment Center in Nashville, Tennessee. After finishing the 2002–03 season with a 42–29–10–1 record, the Wild were awarded the 20th pick in the draft. Despite figuring fourth in the NHL for the previous season with only 178 goals allowed, and scoring only 198 goals, general manager Doug Risebrough selected defenseman Brent Burns in the first round.

Notes

References

 
 

Minn
Minn
Minnesota Wild seasons
National Hockey League All-Star Game hosts